Anfisa Alexandrovna Chekhova  (Russian: Анфи́са Александровна Че́хова; born December 21, 1977, Moscow, USSR) is  a Russian tele- and radio-presenter, singer, actress.

Biography
Anfisa was born December 21, 1977 in Moscow in  family of an athlete and a teacher.

She went to three different schools during childhood. The last was the School of Aesthetic Education with a theatrical slant No. 123.
 
She is   entered GITIS, but not immediately after graduation, in the first year she failed on the exams and entered only the next. She did not manage to finish the training. Subsequently, began a musical career. Then she received an offer from the Muz TV channel to become a TV host of one of the entertainment programs, and took advantage of them.

In 2005–2009, she was the host of the  program on Russian TV channel TNT. September 1, 2009, the actress debuted on the theater stage.

In 2011 she took part in the Ukrainian TV show  Tantsi z zirkamy.

Starred in the films You I Love, S. S. D., Hitler Goes Kaput! and others.

Political position
In 2012, she defended Pussy Riot.

In October 2017, the Good Deeds Party proposed Chekhova to run in the presidential election of 2018, to defend the interests of the people on the main channels of Russian television. Chekhova published the text of the appeal to Instagram, stating that she would accept the offer if her post gained 200 thousand likes.

Personal life
In the summer of 2009, Anfisa Chekhova began to date the actor Guram Bablishvili (born September 5, 1980). May 31, 2012 they had a son, Solomon. In June 2015, Anfisa and Guram officially married, but in the spring of 2017 they divorced.

References

External links
 Official site

1977 births
Living people
Russian television presenters
Russian radio presenters
Russian women radio presenters
Actresses from Moscow
Russian film actresses
Russian television actresses
21st-century Russian actresses
Russian voice actresses
Russian women singers
Singers from Moscow
Russian women television presenters
Russian activists against the 2022 Russian invasion of Ukraine